Bernhard Hochwald (born 27 June 1957 in Schöneiche) is a German sport shooter. He competed in skeet shooting events at the Summer Olympics in 1980, 1988, 1992, and 1996. He is married to the shooter Katja Klepp and the bobsledder Raimund Bethge is his half-brother.

Olympic results

References 

1957 births
Living people
Skeet shooters
German male sport shooters
Shooters at the 1980 Summer Olympics
Shooters at the 1988 Summer Olympics
Shooters at the 1992 Summer Olympics
Shooters at the 1996 Summer Olympics
Olympic shooters of East Germany
Olympic shooters of Germany
20th-century German people
21st-century German people